Marie-Joseph Blaise de Chénier (11 February 1764 – 10 January 1811) was a French poet, dramatist and politician of French and Greek origin.

Biography
The younger brother of André Chénier, Joseph Chénier was born at Constantinople, but brought up at Carcassonne. He was educated in Paris at the Collège de Navarre. Entering the army at seventeen, he left it two years afterwards; and at nineteen he produced Azémire, a two-act drama (acted in 1786), and Edgar, ou le page supposé, a comedy (acted in 1785), which both failed. His Charles IX was kept back for nearly two years by the censor. Chénier attacked the censorship in three pamphlets, and the commotion aroused by the controversy raised keen interest in the piece. When it was at last produced on 4 November 1789 it was an immense success, due in part to its political suggestion, and in part to François Joseph Talma's magnificent portrayal of King Charles IX of France.

Camille Desmoulins said that the piece had done more for the French Revolution than the days of October, and a contemporary memoir-writer, the marquis de Ferrire, says that the audience came away ivre de vengeance et du tourment d'un soir de sang ("drunk with the vengeance and torment of an evening of blood"). The performance was the occasion of a split among the actors of the Comédie-Française, and the new theatre in the Palais Royal, established by the dissidents, was inaugurated with Henri VIII (1791), generally recognized as Chénier's masterpiece; Jean Calas, ou l'école des juges ("Jean Calas, or the judges' school") followed in the same year.

In 1792 he produced his Caïus Gracchus, which was even more revolutionary in tone than its predecessors. It was nevertheless proscribed in the next year at the instance of the Montagnard deputy Albitte, for the anti-anarchical hemistich Des lois et non du sang ("Laws, and not blood"); Fénelon (1793) was suspended after a few representations; and in 1794 Timoléon, set to Etienne Méhul's music, was also proscribed. This piece was played after the Reign of Terror, but the fratricide of Timoléon became the text for insinuations to the effect that by his silence Joseph Chénier had connived at the judicial murder of his brother, André, whom Joseph's enemies alluded to as Abel.

In fact, after some fruitless attempts to save his brother, variously related by his biographers, Joseph became aware that André's only chance of safety lay in being forgotten by the authorities, and that ill-advised intervention would only hasten the end. Joseph Chénier had been a member of the National Convention and had voted for the death of Louis XVI; he belonged to the committees of general security, and of public safety. He was, nevertheless, suspected of moderate sentiments, and before the end of the Terror had become a marked man.

He had a seat in the Council of Five Hundred, and the  tribunat. In 1801 he was one of the educational jury for the Seine département. His political career ended in 1802, when he was eliminated with others from the tribunate for his opposition to Napoleon Bonaparte. From 1803 to 1806 he was inspector-general of public instruction. He had allowed himself to be reconciled with Napoleon's government, and Cyrus, represented in 1804, was written in his honour, but he was temporarily disgraced in 1806 for his Épître à Voltaire. In 1806 and 1807 he delivered a course of lectures at the Athéne on the language and literature of France from the earliest years; and in 1808 at the emperor's request, he prepared his Tableau historique de l'état et du progrés de la littérature française depuis 1789 jusqu'à 1808 ("Historical view of the state and progress of French literature from 1789 to 1808"), a book containing some good criticism, though marred by the violent prejudices of its author.

The list of his works includes hymns and national songs among others, the famous Chant du départ; odes, Sur la mort de Mirabeau, Sur l'oligarchie de Robespierre, etc.; tragedies which never reached the stage, Brutus et Cassius, Philippe deux, Tibère; translations from Sophocles and Lessing, from Thomas Gray and Horace, from Tacitus and Aristotle; with elegies, dithyrambics and Ossianic rhapsodies. As a satirist he possessed great merit, though he sins from an excess of severity, and is sometimes malignant and unjust. He is the chief tragic poet of the revolutionary period, and as Camille Desmoulins expressed it, he decorated Melpomene with the tricolour cockade.

References

1764 births
1811 deaths
People from Carcassonne
18th-century French male writers
18th-century French dramatists and playwrights
19th-century French dramatists and playwrights
18th-century French poets
19th-century French poets
University of Paris alumni
Members of the Académie Française
French people of Greek descent
Burials at Père Lachaise Cemetery
Presidents of the National Convention
Regicides of Louis XVI
Members of the Council of Five Hundred
Critics of religions
Emigrants from the Ottoman Empire to France